Prosegur Compañía de Seguridad, S.A ("Prosegur") is a multinational security company, headquartered in Madrid, Spain.

History
Prosegur was founded in 1976 by Herberto Gut.  It began as a private security company, with a particular focus on power plants, industrial facilities and shopping centres.  In 1987, it became the first security company to list on the Madrid Stock Exchange, and remains the largest company in the private security industry in Spain.

In March 2017, Prosegur demerged its cash business, which listed separately on the Madrid Stock Exchange, Prosegur Cash remains majority owned by Prosegur.

Global presence
Prosegur operates in 26 countries across four continents. Prosegur's entry into new markets, and subsequent expansion has often been through acquisition. Its operations grew initially through Spain, Portugal and Latin America, but have since expanded to other parts of Europe and Asia.

In December 2013, Prosegur entered the Australian market with the acquisition of the second largest cash in transit business in the country, the Australian division of Chubb Security for A$145 million (€95 million) Prosegur holds a market leading position in many of the countries in which it operates, including Spain, Brazil and Germany.

In April 2017, Prosegur's office in Ciudad del Este was robbed in "the biggest heist in Paraguay's history".

Social responsibility
Prosegur actively promotes socially responsible practices.  Examples include:
 It has been awarded the "Top Employer" award in Spain and Brazil by the Top Employers Institute in 2013
 It is a signatory of the UN Global Compact
 It has established the Prosegur Foundation, with a focus on education and social and employment integration for disabled people and corporate volunteer work
 It is a member of the FTSE4Good IBEX index

References

External links
 
Implementation security concept (in German)

Business services companies established in 1976
Companies listed on the Madrid Stock Exchange
Companies based in Madrid
Security companies of Spain
Spanish companies established in 1976